A list of films produced in Egypt in 1944. For an A-Z list of films currently on Wikipedia, see :Category:Egyptian films.

External links
 Egyptian films of 1944 at the Internet Movie Database
 Egyptian films of 1944 elCinema.com

Lists of Egyptian films by year
1944 in Egypt
Lists of 1944 films by country or language